Trongsa District (Dzongkha: ཀྲོང་གསར་རྫོང་ཁག་; Wylie transliteration: Krong-gsar rdzong-khag) is one of the districts of Bhutan. It is the most central district of Bhutan and the geographic centre of Bhutan is located within it at Trongsa Dzong.

Languages
Trongsa is a linguistically diverse district. In the north and east inhabitants speak Bumthangkha, and in the extreme southeast Khengkha is spoken. Nyenkha is spoken in the western half of the district, straddling the border with Wangdue Phodrang District. To the north, along and across the same border, live speakers of Lakha. In the extreme south, the national language Dzongkha is spoken. Across the mid-south, tiny communities of autochthonous 'Olekha (Black Mountain Monpa) speakers have all but disappeared.

Historically, Bumthangkha and its speakers have had close contact with speakers of Kurtöpkha, Mangduepikha and Khengkha, nearby languages of central and eastern Bhutan, to the extent that they may be considered part of a wider collection of "Bumthang languages." Nyenkha, also related to the Bumthang languages, is more divergent while 'Olekha is only distantly related.

Geography
Trongsa covers a total area of 1807 sq km. It is bordered by Wangdue Phodrang District to the west and Bumthang District to the east.  To the south it borders Tsirang, Sarpang, and Zhemgang Districts.

Administrative divisions
Trongsa District is divided into five village blocks (or gewogs):

Dragteng Gewog
Korphu Gewog
Langthil Gewog
Nubi Gewog
Tangsibji Gewog

Environment
Most of Trongsa Districts is environmentally protected. Wangchuck Centennial Park in the north (the gewog of Nubi) and Jigme Singye Wangchuck National Park in central, western, and southern Trongsa (the gewogs of Langthil and Tangsibji) are connected by biological corridors, all of which are protected areas of Bhutan. Biological corridors also occupy substantial portions of the southeast and northeast, leading to Thrumshingla National Park in neighboring districts. Jigme Singye Wangchuck National Park preserves some of Bhutan's wildlife such as the Himalayan Bear and White Langur.

See also
Districts of Bhutan
Trongsa Province

References

 
Districts of Bhutan